The Democratic Union for Social Renewal (UDRS) was a political party in Benin.

History
In the 1991 parliamentary elections the party ran in an alliance with the Alliance for Democracy and Progress (ADP). The alliance received 4% of the vote, winning two seats. At the time, the party was led by Bio Gado Seko N'Goye. By 1994 he had been replaced as leader by Dénis Amoussou-Yéyé, who merged the party into the Benin Rebirth Party that year.

References

Defunct political parties in Benin
Political parties disestablished in 1994